Starod is a village in the Municipality of Ilirska Bistrica in the traditional Littoral region of Slovenia, on the border with Croatia.

The local church in the settlement is dedicated to Saint Joseph and belongs to the Parish of Podgrad.

References

External links
Starod on Geopedia

Populated places in the Municipality of Ilirska Bistrica